Anomaloglossus roraima is a species of frog in the family Aromobatidae. It is found on the tepui of southeastern Venezuela and western Guyana; it is expected to be found in the nearby Brazil. Its type locality is Mount Roraima. It mainly inhabits large bromeliads in tepui scrub and high-tepui meadows at elevations between  asl. The population status is thought to be rare and threatened by disturbance by tourists. The species occurs in Canaima National Park.

References

roraima
Frogs of South America
Amphibians of Guyana
Amphibians of Venezuela
Amphibians described in 1997
Taxa named by Enrique La Marca
Taxonomy articles created by Polbot
Amphibians of the Tepuis